The  is a Marxist–Leninist–Maoist communist party in Japan. It was founded in 1969 centered on the Yamaguchi Prefecture Committee of the Japanese Communist Party, under the leadership of those who supported . 

Currently Maoist, it suffered a schism in 1975 when the Kantō faction of the party embraced the Hoxhaism of the New Zealand Communist Party while the Yamaguchi faction remained supportive of Maoism. The party reunified around Maoism in 1980.

References

External links 
 人民の星 — official website of the party

1969 establishments in Japan
Communist parties in Japan
Far-left politics in Japan
Maoist parties
Political parties established in 1969
Maoism in Asia